Operation Tokat (Turkish: Tokat Harekâtı) was an operation by the Turkish Air Forces and Turkish Land Forces into northern Iraq on 14 June 1996 against the Kurdistan Workers' Party (PKK). After the operation, Turkish government claimed that 6 Turkish troops and 90 PKK rebels were killed.

References 

History of the Kurdistan Workers' Party
Conflicts in 1996
1996 in Iraqi Kurdistan
1996 in Iraq
1996 in Turkey
Cross-border operations of Turkey into Iraq